Der Prozess or Der Prozeß (German for "The Trial") may refer to:

 The Trial (German: Der Process and variants), a novel by Franz Kafka first published in 1925
 Der Prozeß (opera), of 1953 by Gottfried von Einem, based on the Kafka novel
 The Trial (1948 film) (German: Der Prozeß), a 1948 Austrian drama film

See also
 Der Prozeß wird vertagt, an East German film released in 1958
 :de:Prozess (Begriffsklärung), a disambiguation page in German Wikipedia with additional topics